Jesús Antonio Nader Nasrallah (born 2 May 1959) is a Mexican politician affiliated with the National Action Party, currently serving as the mayor of Tampico, Tamaulipas. He was a federal deputy in the LIX Legislature of the Mexican Congress and the Tamaulipas state secretary of administration from 2016 to 2018.

References

1959 births
Living people
People from Tampico, Tamaulipas
Members of the Chamber of Deputies (Mexico)
National Action Party (Mexico) politicians
Politicians from Tamaulipas
21st-century Mexican politicians
Deputies of the LIX Legislature of Mexico